Follistatin-related protein 1 is a protein that in humans is encoded by the FSTL1 gene.

Structure 

This gene encodes a protein with similarity to follistatin, an BMP-4-binding protein. It binds to BMP-4 and TGF-β1, but not Activin A. It contains an FS module (a follistatin-like sequence containing 10 conserved cysteine residues), a Kazal-type serine protease inhibitor domain, 2 EF hand domains, and a Von Willebrand factor type C domain.

Clinical significance

Development 

FSTL1 has a role in development, such as lung development, ureter development, central nervous system development, and skeletal development.

Arthritis 

This gene product is thought to be an autoantigen associated with rheumatoid arthritis.

FSTL1 up-regulates proinflammatory mediators important in the pathology of arthritis, and serum levels of FSTL1 correlate with severity of arthritis.

Cardiovascular diseases
FSTL1 protein seems to have a cardioprotective role.  FSTL1 attenuated hypertrophy following pressure overload and prevented myocardial ischemia/reperfusion injury in a mouse or pig model of ischemia/reperfusion. Muscle-derived Fstl1 modulates vascular remodelling in response to injury.

FSTL1 has been shown to have a pronounced ability as a possible therapeutic to stimulate regeneration following myocardial infarction.  Treating experimental animals (mouse and pig) with FSTL1 after myocardial infarction progressively restored heart function, at least in part by stimulating replication of normally non-dividing heart muscle cells

References

Further reading

External links 
 

EF-hand-containing proteins